Military school of Kaunas might refer to one the educational institutions in Kaunas, Lithuania:

 War School of Kaunas (1919–1940) for junior officers
 Higher Officers' Courses (1921–1940) for senior officers